Guylaine St. Onge (June 1, 1965 – March 3, 2005) was a Canadian actress.

She was born in Saint-Eustache, Quebec. After working as a model and a dancer, she appeared in the Canadian television series Mount Royal in 1988. Other television series followed, including a recurring role on the syndicated western drama series Lonesome Dove: The Outlaw Years" (1995–96) and a lead role on the Showtime drama series Fast Track (1997–98). She also had episode guest appearances on The Outer Limits ("Bodies of Evidence"; season 3, episode 16), La Femme Nikita ("Threshold of Pain"; season 3, episode 12), and Mutant X ("Whiter Shade of Pale"; season 1, episode 11).

She played the role of Juda during the fifth season of the television series Earth: Final Conflict. She also had a role in the 2001 movie Angel Eyes.

In 2005, she died of cervical cancer at the age of 39.

Her ex-husband is Canadian actor David Nerman, who played "Albert", the manservant in several Philadelphia Cream Cheese commercials. They have a son, Aidan.

References

External links
 
 Guylaine St. Onge at NorthernStars.ca

1965 births
2005 deaths
Canadian television actresses
Deaths from cancer in Ontario
Deaths from cervical cancer
People from Saint-Eustache, Quebec
Actresses from Quebec